The Children is a 1998 book by David Halberstam which chronicles the 1959–1962 Nashville Student Movement.

Among the topics covered are the Nashville sit-ins, the Freedom Riders, the formation of SNCC, and activists including James Lawson, James Bevel, Diane Nash, John Lewis, Bernard Lafayette, Marion Barry, and C. T. Vivian.

The book was described by Kirkus Reviews as "a powerful account of a critical time in American history, related in both close-up and wide view." Publishers Weekly called the work "at once intimate and monumental", making note of its "brief, informative essays" on "the sociology of all-white Vanderbilt University; the eccentricities of the Nashville newspapers; a history of city politics in Washington, D.C." and "the role of the Kennedy Justice Department."

References

1998 non-fiction books
Books about African-American history
Books by David Halberstam
Civil rights movement
History books about the United States
Books about activists
Books about Tennessee
African-American history in Nashville, Tennessee
Nashville Student Movement